César Sebök (born 29 November 1931) was an Argentine sailor. He competed in the Dragon event at the 1972 Summer Olympics.

References

External links
 

1931 births
Living people
Argentine male sailors (sport)
Olympic sailors of Argentina
Sailors at the 1972 Summer Olympics – Dragon
Place of birth missing (living people)